The German Amateur Championship is an annual snooker competition played in the Germany and is the highest ranking amateur event in Germany.

The competition was established in 1997. Lasse Münstermann and Patrick Einsle are the most successful champions in the tournaments history having both won the competition 3 times. Since 2005 the tournament has been held in Bad Wildungen. The championship is currently held by Alexander Widau.

Winners

Stats

Finalists

References

Snooker amateur competitions
Snooker competitions in Germany
Recurring sporting events established in 1997
1997 establishments in Germany